Leslie Grace (1905 – August 1, 1968) was an American professional football player who player in the National Football League in 1930 with the Newark Tornadoes, appearing in two games.

References

1905 births
1968 deaths
Newark Tornadoes players
Temple University alumni